Jan Kliment (born 1 September 1993) is a Czech professional footballer who plays as a forward for Viktoria Plzeň.

Club career
Kliment played his youth football for Vysočina Jihlava before joining their senior team. Following his rise to prominence at the 2015 UEFA European Under-21 Championship, where he won the Golden Boot, he departed for VfB Stuttgart prior to the 2015–16 season, signing a deal through 2019.

On 30 August 2016, Kliment was loaned out to Brøndby IF until the end of the season. On 7 July 2017, the loan deal was extended for another season.

In January 2020, Kliment left Stuttgart and returned to the Czech Republic joining 1. FC Slovácko.

In June 2022, Kliment left Wisła Kraków and returned to the Czech Republic joining Viktoria Plzeň.

International career
On 20 June 2015, he scored a hat-trick for the Czech under-21 team in a 4–0 win over Serbia in the group stage of the 2015 UEFA European Under-21 Championship at Letná Stadium in Prague. Kliment was awarded the Golden Boot as highest goalscorer of the tournament with 3 goals.

Kliment made his debut for the Czech Republic national senior team on 1 September 2017 in the 2018 FIFA World Cup qualification against Germany.

Career statistics

Honours

Club
Brøndby IF
Danish Cup: 2017–18

Individual
UEFA European Under-21 Championship Golden Boot: 2015

References

External links

Corgoň Liga profile

FC Vysočina Jihlava profile

1993 births
Living people
Sportspeople from Jihlava
Czech footballers
Association football midfielders
Czech Republic international footballers
Czech Republic youth international footballers
Czech Republic under-21 international footballers
Slovak Super Liga players
Bundesliga players
3. Liga players
Danish Superliga players
Ekstraklasa players
FC Vysočina Jihlava players
FK Dukla Banská Bystrica players
VfB Stuttgart players
VfB Stuttgart II players
Brøndby IF players
1. FC Slovácko players
Wisła Kraków players
Czech expatriate footballers
Czech expatriate sportspeople in Germany
Expatriate footballers in Germany
Czech expatriate sportspeople in Slovakia
Expatriate footballers in Slovakia
Czech expatriate sportspeople in Poland
Expatriate footballers in Poland
FC Viktoria Plzeň players